Jan Willemszoon van der Wilde (1586, Leiden – 1636, Leeuwarden), was a Dutch Golden Age painter.

Biography
According to Houbraken he was a good portrait painter and a contemporary of Wybrand de Geest.

According to the RKD he was influenced by Cornelis Jacobsz Delff. He is known both for portraits and still life paintings. In 1617 he married Sytske Joostedr in Leeuwarden, the widow of Simon Fredrix.

References

Jan Willemsz. van der Wilde on Artnet

1586 births
1636 deaths
Dutch Golden Age painters
Dutch male painters
Artists from Leiden